A metropolitan area's gross domestic product, or GDP, is one of several measures of the size of its economy. Similar to GDP, GMP is defined as the market value of all final goods and services produced within a metropolitan area in a given period of time. In this case the statistics of Eurostat's Urban Audit for larger urban zones have been used.

2020/2021 ranking

See also
 Gross metropolitan product
 List of cities by GDP
 List of metropolitan areas in Europe
 List of metropolitan areas (LUZ) in the European Union
 List of urban areas in the European Union
 List of sovereign states in Europe by GDP (nominal)
 Nomenclature of Territorial Units for Statistics

References

External links
City statistics – Urban audit data collection, Eurostat, European Commission  
Eurostat regional European GRP statistics

 
Metropolitan areas by GDP
Gross domestic product by metropolitan Area
metropolitan areas by GDP
EU, metropolitan areas
EU
GDP